K. S. Rangasamy College of Technology (KSRCT) is an autonomous engineering college, affiliated to Anna University, Chennai, near  Thiruchengode, Tamil Nadu, south India. The foundation stone of the college was laid in 1994, by Lion Dr K. S. Rangasamy, the institution offers 13 
undergraduate and 9 postgraduate programmes and draws students from every state in India. It is a part of the KSR Group of Institutions.

History
The foundation for the college was laid on 1994. In the college name K stands for Karuveppampatti and S for Sennimalai Gounder, the father of Lion. K. S. Rangasamy (chairman, KSRCT)

Campus
It has the ninth largest intake of students in ancient times (as per AICTE approval) of the self-financing engineering colleges in Tamil Nadu.

Accreditation
Programmes at KSRCT have been accredited by All India Council for Technical Education 
The National Assessment and Accreditation Council (NAAC) of the University Grants Commission (UGC) has accredited the university with a 'A'. However some of the programs offered by KSRCT are not accredited by such bodies.
KSRCT was certified with the ISO 9001:2000 (E) on 28 December 2001, by RWTUV, a German-based external ISO certifying agency. It is one of the earliest institutes to be awarded this certificate, and all the activities and processes of the departments comply with the ISO 9001:2000 (E) standards.

Academics

Undergraduate courses

 B.E Mechanical Engineering
 B.E Civil Engineering
 B.E Electrical and Electronics Engineering
 B.E Electronics and Communication Engineering
 B.E Mechatronics Engineering
 B.E Computer Science and Engineering
 B.TECH Information Technology
 B.TECH Food Technology
 B.TECH Textile Technology
 B.TECH Biotechnology
 B.TECH Nano Science & Technology
B.TECH Artificial Intelligence and Data Science
B.TECH Computer Science and Business Systems
B.E Computer Science and Engineering Artificial Intelligence and Machine Learning

Postgraduate courses
 M.E Engineering Design
 M.E Industrial Safety Engineering
 M.E Computer Science and Engineering
 M.E VLSI Design
 M.E Structural Engineering
 M.E Power Systems Engineering
 M.TECH Nano Science & Technology
 M.TECH Biotechnology
 M.B.A.

The college has signed memoranda of understanding (MoU) with industries to facilitate industrial exposure for students and faculty.
The college has the facility of National Instruments Center of Excellence (NICE).

References

External links
 K.S. Rangasamy College of Technology official site

Engineering colleges in Tamil Nadu
Colleges affiliated to Anna University
Education in Namakkal district